Mumps vaccines are vaccines which prevent mumps.

Mumps vaccine may also refer to

 Mumpsvax, a mumps vaccine manufactured by Merck

See also
 MMR vaccine, a vaccine against measles, mumps, and rubella
 MMRV vaccine, a vaccine against measles, mumps, rubella, and varicella (chickenpox)